Tajik Post is the company responsible for postal service in Tajikistan and was established in 1991, after the collapse of the USSR.

References

External links
 
 youbianku.com – Tajik postcode explained

Communications in Tajikistan
Companies of Tajikistan
Postal organizations